KGV Oval is the home headquarters of the Glenorchy football and cricket clubs, as well as the Southern Football League.

The ground is a former TFL and now Tasmanian State League and also a Southern Football League finals venue.

It is located in the heart of Glenorchy less than 1 kilometre from the Glenorchy CBD, and 7 kilometres from Hobart City. It is also the third largest capacity venue in Tasmanian football after North Hobart Oval (18,000), and York Park (20,000).

KGV Oval is not to be confused with KGV Park, an adjoining association football (soccer) ground, which serves as the home of soccer in Tasmania and the base of Football Federation Tasmania.

History

1950–2007
KGV Oval was opened in 1950 by the then Glenorchy Council (Glenorchy gained City status in 1964) to provide a professional standard Australian Rules venue for the Glenorchy District and was originally home to the former Glenorchy Rovers Football Club which had relocated from the nearby Eady Street Ground.

After a merger between Rovers and TFL club New Town after the 1956 season, the club was known as the Glenorchy Football Club and it relocated to KGV from 1957 onwards.

It was named in remembrance of King George V. He was a popular monarch in Australia, which he visited before inheriting the throne, and there are several locations in Glenorchy named after him.

KGV Oval was redeveloped in 1982 when there was a considerable push from both the TANFL and the Glenorchy City Council to make KGV the home of TANFL football away from a decaying North Hobart Oval but the plan failed to materialise and was later shelved by the late 1980s. 
Large gravel mounds were installed around the Elwick Road side of the ground to eventually be covered in grass as a bank for spectators and some terracing was installed at the KGV Avenue end (next to the Cresswell-Beakley Stand) with seating and a new scoreboard built on that side.

Cresswell-Beakley Stand fire

Just three weeks after the Glenorchy Football Club celebrated their first premiership since 1999 by defeating North Launceston in the SFL Premier League grand final, in the early hours of 10 October 2007, a disastrous fire swept through and destroyed the 45-year-old Cresswell-Beakley Stand. The blaze caused $600,000 damage and was believed to have been caused by local youths setting fire to materials in the back corner of the stand, which spread to the curved wooden ceiling (which was unique in its design, intended to cover the roofing trusses to eliminate bird excreta from gathering on the seating) and ignited the seating below.

After many months of debate on what to do with the remains of the stand it was eventually demolished in April 2008.

Cresswell-Beakley stand rebuilt
Construction of the new Cresswell-Beakley Stand began in early 2009 and was finished in November that year. The new grandstand includes covered seating for 500 spectators, multi-purpose function and corporate rooms, new Glenorchy Football Club change rooms, public toilets and disabled access.
 
Its first match that it was officially opened for use was Round 2 of the Tasmanian State League match played between Glenorchy and Hobart on 11 April 2010.

SFL moves to KGV and more redevelopment proposed
It was announced on 23 December 2009 that the Southern Football League would relocate their offices and biggest games from North Hobart Oval to KGV Park as of the 2010 season. During the 2010 Tasmanian State Election campaign the re-elected Bartlett Labor government announced $650,000 for television quality lights and a new electric scoreboard.

2011
In the later months of 2010, work began on the ground's new lights. The lights were first used on 2 April 2011, for the opening game of the 2011 TSL season, with Glenorchy 36 point winners in front of a record crowd of 8,480.

Facilities
The ground has a large playing surface measuring 160m x 134m (East to West) and is also the third largest capacity venue in Tasmanian football after North Hobart Oval (18,000), and Aurora Stadium (20,000).

There are two main grandstands at the venue, the new Cresswell-Beakley Stand at the KGV Avenue end was built in 2009, and the Anfield Street Stand on the broadcast wing was built in 1981. Between these two stands are the Glenorchy Football Clubrooms which was built in 1968. The clubroom complex includes change rooms, offices, a social club, and the main kiosk.

On the broadcast wing near the river end is the Glenorchy Cricket Club clubrooms/change rooms and cricket nets.

References

External links 

 

Landmarks in Hobart
Sports venues in Hobart
Australian rules football grounds
Glenorchy, Tasmania